Tsarevets may refer to the following places in Bulgaria:

Places
 Tsarevets, Dobrich Province
 Tsarevets, Kardzhali Province
 Tsarevets, Veliko Tarnovo Province
 Tsarevets, Vratsa Province

Other
 Tsarevets (fortress)